The EOS-1Ds is a full-frame 11.1-megapixel digital SLR camera body made by Canon in the 1Ds series, released on 24 September 2002. It was Canon's first full-frame DSLR. Its dimensions are 156 x 157.6 x 79.9 mm (6.1 x 6.2 x 3.1 in.) and mass (without a battery) is 1,265 g.

The ~11 megapixel, full size 35mm digital camera was far ahead of other cameras counting usually much less megapixels, and having smaller size frame. The price was $7,999 in 2002.

Functions
Being an autofocus camera, it has two autofocus modes, and an option for manual focusing. Its viewfinder is a glass pentaprism. It also has a two-inch, thin-film transistor, color liquid-crystal monitor with approximately 120,000 pixels.

The camera's image sensor is a CMOS-based integrated circuit with Bayer filters for RGB color detection (Canon calls it single-plate, in contrast with three-CCD sensors). It has approximately 11.4 million effective pixels.  A non-removable optical anti-aliasing filter is located in front of the image sensor.

The shutter is an electronically controlled focal-plane shutter. Its maximum speed is 1/8,000 of one second. Soft-touch shutter release occurs via an electromagnetic signal.

See also
Canon EOS
Canon EF lens mount

References

External links

 Dpreview EOS-1Ds review, December 2002
 Latest Canon EOS Firmware

1Ds
Cameras introduced in 2002
Full-frame DSLR cameras

eo:Canon EOS-1 D